Ndue Paluca (born 28 February 1966, in Pukë) was a member of the Parliament of the Republic of Albania for the Democratic Party of Albania.

References

1966 births
Living people
Democratic Party of Albania politicians
Members of the Parliament of Albania
People from Pukë
21st-century Albanian politicians